Lewis Payne may refer to:
 Lewis Powell (conspirator) (1844–1865), also known as Lewis Payne, American Confederate soldier who attempted to assassinate William H. Seward.
 Lewis F. Payne Jr. (born 1945), American politician from Virginia
 Lewis S. Payne (1819–1898), American merchant, Union Army officer, and politician from New York
 Lewis Payne (footballer) (born 2004), English association footballer

See also 
 Louis Payne (1873–1954), American silent film actor